Taco van der Hoorn (born 4 December 1993) is a Dutch cyclist who currently rides for UCI WorldTeam .

He won stage 3 of the 2021 Giro d'Italia, during his first Grand Tour.

Taco van der Hoorn came in second during 'mini Paris-Roubaix' cobble stage from Lille Métropole to Arenberg in the 2022 Tour de France. He lost by a tire-width margin from Australian cyclist Simon Clark.

Major results

2011
 1st Guido Reybrouck Classic
2014
 7th Zuid Oost Drenthe Classic I
2016
 2nd ZODC Zuidenveld Tour
 8th Overall An Post Rás
1st Stage 1
 9th Schaal Sels-Merksem
 10th Gooikse Pijl
2017
 1st Schaal Sels
 2nd Dwars door het Hageland
 2nd Tacx Pro Classic
 4th Slag om Norg
 8th Grote Prijs Jean-Pierre Monseré
 9th Famenne Ardenne Classic
2018
 1st Primus Classic
 1st Nationale Sluitingprijs
 1st Stage 3 BinckBank Tour
 3rd Antwerp Port Epic
 4th Binche–Chimay–Binche
 5th Druivenkoers Overijse
 9th Paris–Tours
 10th Slag om Norg
2019
 3rd Omloop van het Houtland
2021
 1st Omloop van het Houtland
 1st Stage 3 Giro d'Italia
 1st Stage 3 Benelux Tour
 1st  Active rider classification, Tour de Pologne
 2nd Antwerp Port Epic
2022
 1st Brussels Cycling Classic
 3rd Road race, National Road Championships
 10th Kuurne–Brussels–Kuurne
2023
 4th Kuurne–Brussels–Kuurne
 8th Grand Prix de Denain

Grand Tour general classification results timeline

References

External links

1993 births
Living people
Dutch male cyclists
Cyclists from Rotterdam
Dutch Giro d'Italia stage winners
21st-century Dutch people